Gordon James Downes (23 June 1878 – 7 April 1946) was an Australian rules footballer who played with St Kilda in the Victorian Football League (VFL).

Notes

External links 

1878 births
1946 deaths
Australian rules footballers from Victoria (Australia)
St Kilda Football Club players
South Yarra Football Club players